Do What You Want is an album released in 1999 by New Zealand band Garageland by recording label Flying Nun Records.

Track listing
"Love Song"
"Trashcans"
"You Will Never Cry Again"
"Not Empty"
"Kiss It All Goodbye"
"Good Luck"
"What You Gonna Do?"
"Get Even"
"Good Morning"
"Burning Bridges"
"Jean"
"Middle of the Evening"
"End of the Night"

References

Garageland albums
1999 albums
Flying Nun Records albums